Maxine Bell (born August 6, 1931) is an American politician and a former librarian. Bell was a Republican member of the Idaho House of Representatives.

Early life
On August 6, 1931, Bell was born in Logan, Utah.

Education
Bell earned an Associate of Arts in library science from College of Southern Idaho. Bell also attended Idaho State University.

Career
Bell is a farmer and a retired school librarian in Idaho.

Bell was first elected to the Idaho House of Representatives in 1988.

In November 1992, Bell was reelected to the Idaho House of Representatives for District 24 seat B. On November 8, 1994, as an incumbent, Bell won the election and continued serving District 24 seat B. On November 5, 1996, as an incumbent, Bell won the election and continued serving District 24 seat B. On November 3, 1998, as an incumbent, Bell won the election and continued serving District 24 seat B. On November 7, 2000, as an incumbent, Bell won the election and continued serving District 24 seat B. Bell defeated Monies L. Smith.

On November 5, 2002, Bell was reelected to the Idaho House of Representatives for District 26 seat B. On November 2, 2004, as an incumbent, Bell won the election and continued serving District 26 seat B. On November 7, 2006, as an incumbent, Bell won the election and continued serving District 26 seat B. On November 4, 2008, as an incumbent, Bell won the election and continued serving District 26 seat B. On November 2, 2010, as an incumbent, Bell won the election and continued serving District 26 seat B. Bell defeated Cindy Shotwell.

On November 6, 2012, Bell was reelected to the Idaho House of Representatives for District 25 seat A. On November 4, 2014, as an incumbent,  Bell won the election and continued serving District 25 seat A. On May 17, 2016, Reggy Sternes challenged Bell during the Republican Primary Election but he was defeated. On November 8, 2016, as an incumbent, Bell on the election and continued serving District 25 seat A. In 2018, Bell did not seek for a seat in District 25 seat A.

In December 2018, Bell retired from Idaho House of Representatives after having served for fifteen terms. During the 2022 elections, she served as treasurer for Phil McGrane's campaign for secretary of state of Idaho.

Election history

Awards
 2018 Jean'ne M. Shreeve NSF EPSCoR Research Excellence Award. (December 6, 2018). Presented by Idaho Established Program to Stimulate Competitive Research (EPSCoR). First recipient who is a non-professor.

Personal life
Bell and her husband Jack have three sons.

References

External links
Idaho House page
Maxine Bell's Biography at Vote Smart
 Maxine Bell at ballotpedia.org
StateImpact Idaho article on Bell

1931 births
Living people
Idaho State University alumni
Latter Day Saints from Idaho
Republican Party members of the Idaho House of Representatives
People from Pocatello, Idaho
Farmers from Idaho
American librarians
American women librarians
People from Jerome County, Idaho
Politicians from Logan, Utah
Women state legislators in Idaho
College of Southern Idaho alumni
21st-century American politicians
21st-century American women politicians
Latter Day Saints from Utah
20th-century American politicians
20th-century American women politicians